Warakapola is a town in Kegalle District, Sri Lanka.

References

Populated places in Kegalle District